Tromp may refer to:
 Tromp (surname), a Dutch occupational surname 
 HNLMS Tromp, several ships of the Royal Netherlands Navy named after the admirals
 Tromp-class cruiser, named after the first of these ships
 Tromp-class frigate, two frigates
 TROMP, a biennial percussion competition and music festival and competition in Eindhoven, Netherlands
 Trompowsky Attack, a chess opening

See also
 Trompe, a hydropowered pump which produces pressurised air
 Trump (disambiguation)